Sadhu Sundar Singh (3 September 1889 — 1929?) was an Indian Christian missionary. He is believed to have died in the foothills of the Himalayas in 1929.

Biography

Early years
Sundar Singh was born into a Sikh family in the village of Rampur (near Doraha), Ludhiana district (Punjab state), in northern India. Sundar Singh's mother took him to sit at the feet of a Hindu sadhu, an ascetic holy man, who lived in the jungle some miles away, while also sending him to Ewing Christian High School, Ludhiana, to learn English. Sundar Singh's mother died when he was fourteen. In anger, he burned a Bible page by page while his friends watched. Sundar Singh was also taught the Bhagavad Gita at his home.

Conversion to Christ
Sundar felt that his religious pursuits and the questioning of Christian priests left him without ultimate meaning. Sundar resolved to kill himself by throwing himself upon a railroad track. He asked that whosoever is the 'True God' would appear before him, or else he would kill himself; that very night he had a vision of Jesus. Sundar announced to his father, Sher Singh, that thenceforth he would get converted into the missionary work of Jesus Christ.
His father officially rejected him, and his brother Rajender Singh attempted to poison him. He was poisoned not just once but a number of times. People of that area threw snakes into his house, but he was rescued from mistreatment with the help of a nearby British Christian.

On his sixteenth birthday, he was publicly baptised as a Christian in the parish church in Simla, in the Himalayan foothills. Prior to this, he had been staying at the Christian Missionary Home at Sabathu, near Simla, serving the leprosy patients there.

Life of conversions

In October 1906, he set out on his journey as a new Christian, wearing a saffron turban and the saffron robe of a sadhu, an ascetic devoted to spiritual practice. Singh propagated himself as a sadhu, albeit one within Christianity, because he realised Indians could not be converted unless it was in an Indian way.

"I am not worthy to follow in the steps of my Lord", he said, "but, like Him, I want no home, no possessions. Like Him I will belong to the road, sharing the suffering of my people, eating with those who will give me shelter, and telling all men of the love of God."

After returning to his home village, where he was given an unexpectedly warm welcome, Sundar Singh traveled northward for his mission of converting through the Punjab, over the Bannihal Pass into Kashmir, and then back through Muslim Afghanistan and into the brigand-infested North-West Frontier and Baluchistan. He was referred to as "the apostle with the bleeding feet" by the Christian communities of the north. He suffered arrest and stoning for his beliefs, and experienced mystical encounters.

In 1908, he crossed the frontier of Tibet, where he was appalled by the living conditions. He was stoned as he bathed in cold water because it was believed that "holy men never washed."

In 1908 he went to Bombay, hoping to board a ship to visit Palestine, but was refused a permit, and had to return to the north.

He concluded during his stay in missions that Western civilisation had become the antithesis of original Christian values. He was disillusioned with the materialism and colonialism of Western society and tried to forge an Indian identity for the Indian church. He lamented that Indian Christians adopted British customs, literature and dress that had nothing to do with Christianity and Christ.

Formal Christian training

In December 1909, Singh began training for Christian ministry at the Anglican college in Lahore. According to his biographers, he did not form close relationships with fellow students, meeting them only at meal times and designated prayer sessions. He was ostracised for being "different".

Although Singh had been baptised by an Anglican priest, he was ignorant of the ecclesiastical culture and conventions of Anglicanism. His inability to adapt hindered him from fitting in with the routines of academic study. Much in the college course seemed irrelevant to the gospel as India needed to hear it. After eight months in the college, Singh left in July 1910.

It has been claimed by his biographers that Singh's withdrawal was due to stipulations laid down by Bishop Lefroy. As an Anglican priest, Singh was told to discard his sadhu's robe and wear "respectable" European clerical dress, use formal Anglican worship, sing English hymns and not preach outside his parish without permission. As an ardent devotee of Christ who was interested only in spreading his message, he rejected the mixing of Jesus Christ and British culture.

Converting others

Stories from those years are astonishing and sometimes incredible and full of miracles which helped in conversion. Indeed, there were those who insisted that they were mystical rather than real happenings. That first year, 1912, he returned with an extraordinary account of finding a three-hundred-year-old hermit in a mountain cave—the Maharishi of Kailas, with whom he spent some weeks in deep fellowship.

According to Singh, in a town called Rasar he had been thrown into a dry well full of bones and rotting flesh and left to die, but three days later he was rescued.

The secret Missionaries group is alleged to have numbered around 24,000 members across India. The origins of this brotherhood were reputed to be linked to one of the Magi at Christ's nativity and then the second-century AD disciples of the apostle Thomas circulating in India. Nothing was heard of this evangelistic fellowship until William Carey began his missionary work in Serampore. The Maharishi of Kailas experienced ecstatic visions about the secret fellowship that he retold to Sundar Singh, and Singh himself built his spiritual life around visions.

Whether he won many continuing disciples on these hazardous Tibetan treks is not known. One reason why no one believed his version of this story was because Singh did not keep written records and he was unaccompanied by any other Christian disciples who might have witnessed the events.

Travels abroad

During his twenties, Sundar Singh's gospel work widened greatly, and long before he was thirty, his name and picture were familiar all over the Christian world. He described a struggle with Satan to retain his humility, but people described him as always human, approachable and humble, with a sense of fun and a love of nature. This character, with his illustrations from ordinary life, gave his addresses great impact. Many people said, "He not only looks like Jesus, he talks like Jesus must have talked." His talks and his personal speech were informed by his habitual early-morning meditation, especially on the gospels. In 1918 he made a long tour of South India and Ceylon, and the following year he was invited to Burma, Malaya, China and Japan.

Some of the stories from these tours were as strange as any of his Tibetan adventures. He claimed power over wild things. He claimed even to have power over disease and illness, though he never allowed his presumed healing gifts to be publicised.

For a long time Sundar Singh had wanted to visit Britain, and the opportunity came when his father, Sher Singh, who was converted too, gave him the money for his fare to Britain. He visited the West twice, travelling to Britain, the United States and Australia in 1920, and to Europe again in 1922. He was welcomed by Christians of many traditions, and his words searched the hearts of people who now faced the aftermath of World War I and who seemed to evidence a shallow attitude to life. Singh was appalled by what he saw as the materialism, emptiness and irreligion he found throughout the West, contrasting it with Asia's awareness of God, no matter how limited that might be. Once back in India he continued his gospel-proclamation work, though it was clear that he was getting more physically frail.

Final trip
In 1923, Singh made the last of his regular summer visits to Tibet and came back exhausted. His preaching days were apparently over and, in the following years, in his own home or those of his friends in the Simla hills, he gave himself to meditation, fellowship and writing some of the things he had lived to preach.

In 1929, against all his friends' advice, Singh wished to make one last journey to Tibet. He was last seen on 18 April 1929 setting off on this journey. In April he reached Kalka, a small town below Simla, a prematurely aged figure in his yellow robe among pilgrims and holy men who were beginning their own trek to one of Hinduism's holy places some miles away. Where he went after that is unknown. Whether he died of exhaustion or reached the mountains remains a mystery.

In the early 1940s, Bishop Augustine Peters, another converted missionary from South India, sought out Singh's brother Rajender, led him to the Christian faith and baptised him in Punjab. Rajender Singh referred to many reputed miracles performed by Singh and people converted to Christ under his ministry.

Singh is revered by many as a formative, towering figure in the missionary conversions of the Christian church in India.

Postmortem prophecies

Singh's apocalyptic prophecies about the fate of Romania are famous in that country, but are apocryphal, being written by a medium who said he was channeling Singh's spirit. These look more like warmongering propaganda than Christian theology and were probably written about 1939.

Recognition by other Christians
Singh is respected in the Malankara Syrian Orthodox Church and the Coptic Church, although neither officially recognises him as a saint. He was invited to address the Mateer Memorial Congregation (now the Mateer Memorial CSI Church) when he arrived in Travancore on 12 February 1918. 

Sadhu is remembered in the Church of England with a commemoration on 19 June.

In 2022, Singh's story was dramatised as a two-part broadcast through Pacific Garden Mission's Unshackled! radio ministry, airing as programs 3725 and 3726.

In popular culture 
Ken Anderson made Journey to the Sky, a 1967 Christian drama film which starred Indian actor Manhar Desai (Malcolm Alfredo Desai) in the lead role of Sadhu Sundar Singh.

Aldous Huxley mentions Singh in his book The Perennial Philosophy, quoting him: "The children of god are very dear but very queer, very nice but very narrow"

Timeline
 1889 – Born at Rampur Kataania, Ludhiana, Punjab
 1903 – Conversion
 1904 – Cast out from home
 1905 – Baptised in Simla; begins life as a sadhu
 1907 – Works in leprosy hospital at Sabathu
 1908 – First visit to Tibet
 1909 – Enters Divinity College, Lahore, to train for the ministry
 1911 – Hands back his preacher's license; returns to the sadhu's life
 1912 – Tours through north India and the Buddhist states of the Himalayas
 1918 to 1922 – Travels worldwide
 1923 – Turned back from Tibet
 1925 to 1927 – Quietly spends time writing
 1927 – Sets out for Tibet but returns due to illness
 1929 – Final attempt to reach Tibet
 1972 – Sadhu Sundar Singh Evangelical Association formed

Works by Sundar Singh
Sundar Singh wrote eight books between 1922 and 1929. His manuscripts were written in Urdu, and later translated into English and other languages.
 At the Master's Feet (London: Fleming H. Revell, 1922). Electronic versions: Google Books and CCEL.
 With and Without Christ (London: Cassell; New York: Harper & Brothers, 1929). Archive.org
 The Real Life (published posthumously; Madras: CLS, 1965).
 The Real Pearl (published posthumously; Madras: CLS, 1966).
 Reality and Religion: Meditations on God, Man and Nature (London: Macmillan, 1924). Google Books
 The Search after Reality: Thoughts on Hinduism, Buddhism, Muhammadanism and Christianity (London: Macmillan, 1925). Google Books
 Meditations on Various Aspects of the Spiritual Life (London: Macmillan, 1926). Archive.org
 Visions of the Spiritual World (London: Macmillan, 1926). Archive.org

A number of his works were compiled and edited by others:
 The Cross Is Heaven: The Life and Writings of Sadhu Sundar Singh, edited by A. J. Appasamy (London: Lutterworth Press, 1956). – A collection of short articles by Sundar Singh.
 Life in Abundance, edited by A. F. Thyagaraju (Madras: CLS, 1980). – This is a collection of transcripts of his sermons, preached in Switzerland in March 1922, as recorded by Alys Goodwin.
 The Christian Witness of Sadhu Sundar Singh: A Collection of His Writings, edited by T. Dayanandan Francis (Madras, India: The Christian Literature Society, 1989).

References

Further reading
 Gaebler, Paul. Sadhu Sundar Singh, Leipzig: 1937 (German).
 Surya Prakash, Perumalla. The Preaching of Sadhu Sundar Singh: A Homiletic Analysis of Independent Preaching and Personal Christianity, Bengaluru (Bangalore): Wordmakers, 1991. Google Books. Internet, accessed 30 November 2008.
 Surya Prakash, Perumalla. Sadhu Sundar Singh's Contribution, in Hedlund, Roger E. (Edited), Christianity is Indian: The Emergence of an Indigenous Community, Revised edition (New Delhi: ISPCK, 2004), pp. 113–128.
 Appasamy, A. J. Sundar Singh (Cambridge: Lutterworth, 1958).
 Davey, Cyril J. The Story of Sadhu Sundar Singh (Chicago: Moody Press, 1963); reprinted as Sadhu Sundar Singh (Bromley: STL Books, 1980).
 Francis, Dayanandan, ed. The Christian Witness of Sadhu Sundar Singh (Alresford: Christian Literature Society, 1989).
 Stevens, Alec. Sadhu Sundar Singh (Dover, NJ: Calvary Comics, 2006).
 Streeter, Burnett; and Appasamy, A. J. The Sadhu: a Study in Mysticism and Practical Religion (London: Macmillan, 1921).
 Thompson, Phyllis. Sadhu Sundar Singh (Carlisle: Operation Mobilisation, 1992).
 Watson, Janet Lynn. The Saffron Robe (London: Hodder and Stoughton, 1975).
 Woodbridge, John. More Than Conquerors (Australia: 1992).
 Benge, Geoff and Janet. Sundar Singh: Footprints Over the Mountains (Christian Heroes: Then and Now Series).
 Much of the above detail was provided by this book.
 Andrews, C. F. Sadhu Sundar Singh: A Personal Memoir (New York: Harper & Brothers, 1934).
 Reasons, Joyce. The man who disappeared: Sundar Singh of India (London: Edinburgh House Press, 1937).
 Daniel, Joshua. Sadhu Sundar Singh: He Walked with God (Laymens Evangelical Fellowship, 1988). https://lefi.org/library/singh.txt

External links
 The Wisdom of the Sadhu free ebook from Plough Publishing in English, Spanish and Russian.
 Free Ebooks by the Sadhu (Epub, Mobi and txt files) at archive.org
 The prophecies of Sundar Singh about New Jerusalem
 Books by and about Sadhu Sundar Singh at Internet Archive for free to read
 Sadhu Sundar Singh - He Walked with God - Biography

1889 births
1929 deaths
20th-century Christian mystics
Scholars from Ludhiana
Punjabi people
Converts to Christianity from Sikhism
Indian Anglicans
Indian Anglican missionaries
Indian evangelicals
Protestant missionaries in Tibet
Protestant mystics
Anglican writers
Evangelical Anglicans
Anglican saints